The Roman Catholic Diocese of Nyundo is an ecclesiastical territory or diocese of the Roman Catholic Church in Rwanda, with headquarters at Nyundo. It was erected on February 14, 1952 as the Apostolic Vicariate of Nyundo by Pope Pius XII, from part of the Apostolic Vicariate of Ruanda. It was elevated to the rank of a diocese on November 10, 1959 by Pope John XXIII. The diocese is a suffragan of the Archdiocese of Kigali.

The current Bishop of Nyundo is Anaclet Mwumvaneza.

Bishops

List of bishops of Nyundo
Aloys Bigirumwami (1952–1973) (including as Vicar Apostolic, 1952-1959)
Vincent Nsengiyumva (1973–1976), appointed Archbishop of Kigali
Wenceslas Kalibushi (1976–1997)
Alexis Habiyambere, SJ (1997–2016)
Anaclet Mwumvaneza (2016–Present)

Other priest of this diocese who became bishop
Vincent Harolimana, appointed Bishop of Ruhengeri in 2012

External links
Catholic-Hierarchy
GCatholic.org

Christian organizations established in 1952
Roman Catholic dioceses in Rwanda
Roman Catholic dioceses and prelatures established in the 20th century
1952 establishments in Rwanda